Hans (Johannes) Gustav Winckelmann, also Hans Winkelmann, (14 September 1881 – 9 October 1943) was a German operatic tenor and opera director.

Life 
Born in Hamburg, the son of Wagner singer Hermann Winkelmann, whose grandfather was the founder of the Braunschweig piano factory  Christian Ludewig Theodor Winkelmann, whose other ancestors included Johann Joachim Winckelmann, was trained by his father to play Wagner tenor and studied in Vienna, where he obtained a doctorate in philosophy. He began his career as a singer at the Vienna Volksoper and then became first tenor at the Prague Opera, later in Schwerin. In his Schwerin period he made three films in Berlin in 1921 and 1922 and finally in Hanover, where he also directed about six operas a year with Rudolf Krasselt. Until his death in 1943 or only until his removal from office by the Nazis he was head conductor at the opera house in Hannover. He also wrote a book with the title Der Opernspieler. (Leipzig: Beck 1940).

He made a first marriage in Vienna and a second during his time in Prague. Winckelmann's love affair with Lala Pringsheim (Klara Koszler) allegedly produced the son . On 8 June 1927, he married the dancer Almut Upmeyer, with whom he had two children: Helga (1939–1967) and Axel Winckelmann (1942–1965). In 1943 he married his last wife Hilde, after a 17 years lasting affair. During the air raids on Hanover he sent his advanced pregnant wife to Salzburg, where his daughter Maria was born. He himself stayed behind in Hanover and died of heart failure during the English bombing at the age of 62.

Filmography 
 1921: Das Souper um Mitternacht. Abenteuer des Detektivs Harry Wills.
 1921: Die Schatzkammer im See.
 1921/1922: Matrosenliebste.

Literature 
 Klaus Pringsheim jr., Victor Boesen: Wer zum Teufel sind Sie? Ein Leben mit der Familie Mann. 2nd edition. Berlin 2002, .
 Die Familien Winckelmann, Pringsheim und Mann. In Die Welt

References

External links 
 Hans Winkelmann on Filmportal.de
 Hans Winkelmann on LMU
 Winkelsmann Hans on Operissimo
 

1881 births
1943 deaths
Musicians from Hamburg
German operatic tenors
German opera directors
Heldentenors
German male silent film actors
20th-century German male actors
20th-century German male opera singers
German civilians killed in World War II
Deaths by airstrike during World War II